Alastair Gray (born 22 June 1998) is a British tennis player.

Gray has a career high ATP singles ranking of World No. 237 achieved on 19 September 2022. He also has a career high ATP doubles ranking of World No. 304 achieved on 20 June 2022.

Gray made his ATP main draw debut at the 2019 Hall of Fame Open after receiving a wildcard for the singles tournament.

He made his Grand Slam debut at the 2022 Wimbledon Championships as a wildcard where he won his first match against Tseng Chun-hsin.

Gray played college tennis at Texas Christian University.

Personal
Gray attended Parkside School, Cobham, his time there overlapping with fellow British tennis player Jack Draper.

Playing style
Gray plays right-handed with a one-handed backhand. He prefers hard and grass court surfaces. The standout feature of his game is a highly effective first serve, the sound of which has been compared to a gunshot.

ATP Challenger and ITF World Tennis Tour Finals

Singles: 8 (5–3)

Doubles: 7 (5–2)

References

External links

1998 births
Living people
British male tennis players
Sportspeople from Twickenham
TCU Horned Frogs men's tennis players
Tennis people from Greater London
Texas Christian University alumni
People educated at Parkside School, Cobham
English male tennis players